Stefan Keuter (born 19 August 1972) is a German politician for the Alternative for Germany (AfD) and a member of the Bundestag since 2017.

Life and politics

Keuter was born 1972 in the West German city of Essen and became an entrepreneur. Keuter entered the newly founded populist AfD and became after the 2017 German federal election member of the Bundestag. Die Zeit described Keuters political positions within AfD after his election 2017 as "ultra right".

Stefan Keuter is known for his strong ties to the Russian government. When the Russian invasion of Ukraine had started, he took part in a conference entitled "Economy against sanctions" with representatives of Russian politics and business in May 2022. One of the topics discussed was how best to deal with the international sanctions.

References

1972 births
Politicians from Essen
Members of the Bundestag for North Rhine-Westphalia
Living people
Members of the Bundestag 2021–2025
Members of the Bundestag 2017–2021
Members of the Bundestag for the Alternative for Germany